Lingshou is a town in and the seat of Lingshou County, in southwestern Hebei province, China, about  north-northwest of the provincial capital of Shijiazhuang. , it has 3 residential communities and 22 villages under its administration.

See also
List of township-level divisions of Hebei

References

Township-level divisions of Hebei